Episynlestes albicauda is a species of Australian damselfly in the family Synlestidae,
commonly known as a southern whitetip. 
It is endemic to south-eastern Queensland and north-eastern New South Wales, where it inhabits streams and pools in rainforests.

Episynlestes albicauda is a large, very slender damselfly, coloured a dull bronze-black with white markings. It often perches with its wings outspread.

Gallery

See also
 List of Odonata species of Australia

References 

Synlestidae
Odonata of Australia
Insects of Australia
Endemic fauna of Australia
Taxa named by Robert John Tillyard
Insects described in 1913
Damselflies
Taxobox binomials not recognized by IUCN